The 2025 IIHF World Championship will be co-hosted by Stockholm, Sweden, and Herning, Denmark from 9 to 25 May 2025. This decision regarding Sweden was made at the 2018 semi-annual International Ice Hockey Federation (IIHF) congress in Malta, and was officially announced on 24 May 2019, at the IIHF's annual congress during the World Championships in Bratislava, Slovakia. At the same time, it was announced that Denmark will co-host the championship.

Venues

Participants 
 (qualified as host)
 (qualified as host)

References 

2025 Men
2025 in ice hockey
Scheduled ice hockey competitions